Golf was contested at the 2019 South Asian Games. The events were hosted at the Gokarna Forest Resort, in Kathmandu, Nepal from 3 to 6 December 2019.

Medal summary

Medal table

Medalists

Source:

References

2019 South Asian Games
Events at the 2019 South Asian Games
Golf at the South Asian Games
South Asian Games